Osbeckia is a genus of plants in the family Melastomataceae. It was named by Carl Linnaeus for the Swedish explorer and naturalist Pehr Osbeck (1723–1805).

Distribution
Osbeckias are native to Eastern Asia — China, Japan, Malaysia, India, Sri Lanka and Australasia. Some species have been investigated as herbal remedies.

Accepted species
The following 11 species are accepted botanical names.

Osbeckia afzelii (Hook. f.) Cogn.   
Osbeckia capitata Benth. ex Naudin   
Osbeckia chinensis L.	   
Osbeckia crinita Benth. ex C.B. Clarke  
Osbeckia decandra (Sm.) DC.  
Osbeckia nepalensis Hook. f.  
Osbeckia nutans Wall. ex C.B. Clarke
Osbeckia porteresii Jacq.-Fél.
Osbeckia praviantha Jacq.-Fél.
Osbeckia stellata Buch.-Ham. ex Ker Gawl.
Osbeckia tubulosa Sm.

Unresolved species
Following botanical names are used in the texts, but categorized as Unresolved by The Plant List.

Osbeckia aspera  Bl.
Osbeckia brachystemon  Naudin
Osbeckia calotricha  A. Chev.
Osbeckia capitata  Benth. ex Walp.
Osbeckia ciliaris  Ser. ex DC.
Osbeckia cogniauxiana  De Wild.
Osbeckia crepiniana  Cogn.
Osbeckia cupularis  D. Don ex Wight & Arn.
Osbeckia elliptica  Naudin
Osbeckia incana  E. Mey. ex Hochst.
Osbeckia lanata Alston
Osbeckia leschnaultiana  DC.
Osbeckia liberica  Stapf
Osbeckia mehrana  Giri & Nayar
Osbeckia muralis  Naudin
Osbeckia octandra  DC.
Osbeckia porteresii  Jacq.-Fél.
Osbeckia praviantha  Jacq.-Fél.
Osbeckia pusilla  De Wild.
Osbeckia reticulata  Bedd.
Osbeckia rubicunda  Arn.
Osbeckia septemnervia  Ham. ex Craib
Osbeckia tubulosa  Sm.
Osbeckia umlaasiana  Hochst.
Osbeckia virgata  D. Don ex Wight & Arn.
Osbeckia wattii  Craib
Osbeckia wynaadensis  C.B. Clarke
Osbeckia zeylanica  Steud. ex Naudin

References

External links

 
Melastomataceae genera
Medicinal plants
Taxa named by Carl Linnaeus